Friends of the Earth Korea is a non-profit organization in South Korea. It shares a vision and cooperates with Friends of the Earth for the conservation of nature and life.

Friends is better known in Korea as KFEM (Korean Federation for Environmental Movement), as well as "Korea Federation for Environmental Movements". KFEM consists of 50 local organizations, and its national headquarters is in Seoul. KFEM also has affiliated institutions in the specialized areas of conservation, environmental lawsuits, research, communication, education, publication, and the green market.

See also
 Air pollution in South Korea
 Climate change in South Korea
 Environment of South Korea
 Pollution in Korea

External links 
 Citizens’ Information Center for Environment 
 Public Center for Environmental Law 
 Korean Environmental Education Center 
 KFEM's monthly magazine 
 KFEM's green market 

Environmental organizations based in South Korea